Oakley is a city in Cassia County, Idaho, United States. The population was 763 at the 2010 census, up from 668 in 2000. It is part of the Burley Micropolitan Statistical Area.

Geography
It is at the very southern limit of the Snake River Plain, and close to Goose Creek, between the Middle and Albion Mountains.

Climate

According to the Köppen Climate Classification system, Oakley has a cold semi-arid climate, abbreviated "BSk" on climate maps.

History 
The city was named for William Oakley, the proprietor of a 19th-century stagecoach station located at a spring currently located about 2 miles west of the present townsite known as Oakley Meadows. David B. Haight, former member of the Quorum of the Twelve Apostles, of the Church of Jesus Christ of Latter-day Saints was born in Oakley. The small hamlet has served as home to a surprising number of famous Americans.  The former governors of Utah and Massachusetts can trace their stock to Oakley. Jon Huntsman of Utah is the grandson of David B. Haight, above, and Mitt Romney, of Massachusetts is the son of another famous Oakley-ite, George Romney. Yet another Oakley Romney, Marion G. Romney, was a Counselor in the First Presidency of the Church of Jesus Christ of Latter-day Saints.

The historic Howells Opera House was established in 1907 and still serves and the surrounding areas.

Oakley is also rich in old west lore, such as the tale of Diamondfield Jack, and another story of intrigue, the story of Gobo Fango.

This town of fewer than 800 people has turned out leaders in politics, business, and entertainment. The town is also home to the current Idaho House of Representatives Speaker Scott Bedke.

Oakley has become recognized worldwide for its Middle Mountain quarries of Rocky Mountain quartzite building stone known as Oakley Stone.  Quarry operators ship out thousand of tons a month to locations around the globe.

Today Oakley is often visited for its annual Pioneer Days celebrations, as well as its historic Victorian homes.

Demographics

2010 census
As of the census of 2010, there were 763 people, 248 households, and 192 families residing in the city. The racial makeup of the city was 92.5% White, 0.1% Native American, 0.3% Asian, 6.6% from other races, and 0.5% from two or more races. Hispanic or Latino of any race were 9.4% of the population.

There were 248 households, of which 37.9% had children under the age of 18 living with them, 67.3% were married couples living together, 8.5% had a female householder with no husband present, 1.6% had a male householder with no wife present, and 22.6% were non-families. 21.4% of all households were made up of individuals, and 11.3% had someone living alone who was 65 years of age or older. The average household size was 3.08 and the average family size was 3.60.

The median age in the city was 34.6 years. 35.8% of residents were under the age of 18; 5% were between the ages of 18 and 24; 22.1% were from 25 to 44; 20.8% were from 45 to 64; and 16.4% were 65 years of age or older. The gender makeup of the city was 49.9% male and 50.1% female.

2000 census
As of the census of 2000, there were 668 people, 226 households, and 166 families residing in the city. The racial makeup of the city was 96.41% White, 0.15% Asian, 3.14% from other races, and 0.30% from two or more races. Hispanic or Latino of any race were 4.19% of the population.

There were 226 households, out of which 39.8% had children under the age of 18 living with them, 62.4% were married couples living together, 7.5% had a female householder with no husband present, and 26.5% were non-families. 26.1% of all households were made up of individuals, and 16.8% had someone living alone who was 65 years of age or older.  The average household size was 2.93 and the average family size was 3.60.

In the city, the population was spread out, with 33.8% under the age of 18, 7.6% from 18 to 24, 20.5% from 25 to 44, 21.9% from 45 to 64, and 16.2% who were 65 years of age or older.  The median age was 36 years. For every 100 females, there were 95.9 males.  For every 100 females age 18 and over, there were 93.0 males.

The median income for a household in the city was $29,643, and the median income for a family was $34,792. Males had a median income of $27,083 versus $16,667 for females. The per capita income for the city was $13,983.  About 9.1% of families and 14.7% of the population were below the poverty line, including 27.2% of those under age 18 and 4.8% of those age 65 or over.

Education
Oakley is in the Cassia County School District.

Oakley is zoned to:
 Oakley Elementary School
 Oakley Junior/Senior High School

All of the schools are in the city of Oakley.

The high school has about 120 students, and the elementary has about 250 students. The high school's football team won the Idaho State Football Championship in 2007, and 2009 and took 2nd place in 2008,

References

External links
Untraveled Road.com - photos - Oakley, Idaho
Ultimate Idaho.com - Oakley
Visit Idaho.org - Oakley
Oakley High School
Cassia County School District
Air Nav.com - Oakley Municipal Airport

Cities in Cassia County, Idaho
Cities in Idaho
Burley, Idaho micropolitan area